Bydlino  is a village in the administrative district of Gmina Słupsk, within Słupsk County, Pomeranian Voivodeship, in northern Poland. 

The village has a population of 210.

Notable residents

 David Ruhnken (1723–1798), scholar

References

Bydlino